Dorothea (or Dorothy) of Montau (6 February 1347 – 25 June 1394) was an anchoress and visionary of 14th century Prussia. After centuries of veneration in Central Europe, she was canonized in 1976.

Life
Dorothea was born at Groß Montau, Prussia (Mątowy Wielkie) to the west of Marienburg (Malbork) to a wealthy farmer from Holland, Willem Swarte (Schwartze). She was married at the age of 16 or 17 to the swordsmith Adalbrecht of Danzig (Gdańsk), an ill-tempered man in his 40s. Almost immediately after marrying she began to experience visions. Her husband had little patience with her spiritual experiences and abused her. Later, she converted him and both made pilgrimages to Cologne, Aachen, and Einsiedeln. While Dorothea, with her husband's permission, was on pilgrimage to Rome, he died in 1389 or 1390. Of their nine children eight died, four in infancy, and four during the plague of 1383. The surviving daughter, Gertrud, joined the Benedictines.

In the summer of 1391 Dorothea moved to Marienwerder (Kwidzyn), and on 2 May 1393, with the permission of the chapter and of the Teutonic Order, established an anchoress's cell against the wall of the cathedral. She never left that cell for the rest of her life. Kwidzyn is in Poland.

Dorothea led a very austere life. Numerous visitors sought her advice and consolation, and she had visions and revelations. Her confessor, the deacon Johannes of Marienwerder, a learned theologian, wrote down her communications and composed a Latin biography in seven books, Septililium, besides a German life in four books, printed by Jakob Karweyse

Dorothea died in Kwidzyn in 1394. A devotee of the Passion of Jesus and the Eucharist, she is the only Polish saint to have stigmata.

Veneration
Dorothea was venerated popularly from the moment of her death as the guardian of the country of the Teutonic Knights and patron saint of Prussia/Pomerania. In 1405, 257 witnesses described her virtues and miracles. The formal process of canonization, however, was broken off, and not resumed until 1955; she was finally canonized by Pope Paul VI (cultus confirmed) in 1976.

Dorothea's feast day is celebrated on 25 June. Her relics were lost, probably during the Protestant Reformation.

Literature
Her life, seen from the viewpoint of her embittered husband, is one of the subjects of the 1977 novel The Flounder by Günter Grass.

See also
Christian monasticism
Consecrated life

References

Stargardt, Ute (ed.), 1997. "The life of Dorothea von Montau, a fourteenth-century recluse" (original text by Johannes of Marienwerder, d. 1417). Lewiston: E. Mellen Press.

External links
Saint of the Day  at St. Patrick Catholic Church
Heiligenlexikon article 
Dorota z Mątowów 

1347 births
1394 deaths
German Roman Catholic saints
People from the Kingdom of Prussia
People from Kwidzyn
People from the State of the Teutonic Order
14th-century Christian saints
Christian female saints of the Middle Ages
14th-century German women
Hermits